Alice James (August 7, 1848 – March 6, 1892) was an American diarist, sister of novelist Henry James and philosopher and psychologist William James. Her relationship with William was unusually close, and she seems to have been badly affected by his marriage. James suffered lifelong health problems that were generally dismissed as hysteria in the style of the day. She is best known for her published diaries.

Life
Born into a wealthy and intellectually active family, daughter of Henry James Sr. of Albany, New York, and Mary Robertson Walsh, James soon developed the psychological and physical problems that would plague her until the end of her life at age 43. The youngest of five children, she lived with her parents until their deaths in 1882. She taught history from 1873 to 1876 for the Society to Encourage Studies at Home, a Boston-based correspondence school for women founded by Anna Eliot Ticknor. The three years she taught were "among the most illness-free she had." James never married, seeking affection from her brothers and female friends instead. After her father's death in late 1882, she inherited a share in the income from the family properties in Albany, and her brother Henry made over his own share to her. This allowed her to live independently. By 1882, she had suffered at least two major breakdowns and would experience several more before her death from breast cancer at age 43 in 1892.

Era of hysteria

In the Victorian era, hysteria was an extremely common diagnosis for women. Almost any disease a woman had could fit the symptoms of hysteria because there was no set list of symptoms. In 1888, twenty years after James was "overwhelmed by violent turns of hysteria", she wrote in her diary that she was both suicidal and homicidal. She was struggling with the urge to kill her father, though this diary entry does not state the reason why she was patricidal. In 1866 James traveled to New York to receive "therapeutic exercise", and in 1884 she received electrical "massage". Hoping that a change of scenery would improve her health, she traveled to England with her companion Katharine Loring. She suffered recurring bouts of "hysteria" for the next eight years until she died from breast cancer. James sought various treatments for her disorders but never found significant relief.

Opium letter
As Alice was suffering from breast cancer, her brother, William James, wrote her a letter explaining how much he pitied her. He advised her to "look for the little good in each day as if life were to last a hundred years." He wanted her to save herself from suffering the torment of physical pain. "Take all the morphia (or other forms of opium if that disagrees) you want, and don't be afraid of becoming an opium-drunkard. What was opium created for except for such times as this?" While opium was a freely available panacea at this time, it is unknown if Alice James used it prior to her cancer, late in life.

Diary
James began to keep a diary in 1889. Full of witty, acerbic, insightful comments on English life and manners, it included excerpts from various publications to support her opinions. The diary was not published for many years after her death due to sharp comments on various persons whom she had mentioned by name. A poorly edited version of the diary was eventually released in 1934. Leon Edel edited a fuller edition in 1964. The diary has made James something of a feminist icon. She was seen as struggling through her illnesses to find her own voice.

Henry, one of Alice's brothers, read this work with deep alarm (because of its candid indiscretions about family and friends) but also with enormous admiration. He wrote in a letter to another of the James brothers, William, that he now understood what had caused their sister's debility. The diary, Henry said, displayed for him Alice's great "energy and personality of intellectual and moral being," but also, "puts before me what I was tremendously conscious of in her lifetimethat the extraordinary intensity of her will and personality really would have made the equal, the reciprocal life of a 'well' personin the usual worldalmost impossible to herso that her disastrous, her tragic health was in a manner the only solution for her of the practical problems of lifeas it suppressed the element of equality, reciprocity, etc."

Alice, however, did not see her illness as a product of conflict between her character and her "usual world" surroundings. To her it was instead the outcome of a struggle between her "will" or "moral power" and her "body". "In looking back now," she wrote toward the end of her life, "I see how it began in my childhood, altho' I was not conscious of the necessity until '67 or '68 [when she was 19 and 20] when I broke down first, acutely, and had violent turns of hysteria. As I lay prostrate after the storm with my mind luminous and active and susceptible of the clearest, strongest impressions, I saw so distinctly that it was a fight simply between my body and my will, a battle in which the former was to be triumphant to the end ..."

She eventually found, she continued, that she had to let loose of her body, giving up "muscular sanity" in order to preserve her mind: "So, with the rest, you abandon the pit of your stomach, the palms of your hands, the soles of your feet, and refuse to keep them sane when you find in turn one moral impression after another producing despair in the one, terror in the others, anxiety in the third and so on until life becomes one long flight from remote suggestion and complicated eluding of the multifold traps set for your undoing."

Relationship with William
Howard Feinstein, in Becoming William James (1984), wrote that Alice and her brother William had a close relationship that has been argued to consist of eroticism.  William would write “mock sonnets” to Alice and read them to her in front of their family. One such sonnet has William declaring his desire to marry Alice, "I swore to ask thy hand, my love." The sonnet goes on to describe Alice rejecting him, "So very proud, but yet so fair/The look you on me threw/You told me I must never dare/To hope for love from you." William concludes the sonnet by saying that he will commit suicide because Alice will not marry him. There were also times where his letters to her were candidly erotic—he would describe her physical and personality characteristics and state how “desirable” and “lovable” they made her.

Feinstein recounts that William used his artistic skill to draw five sketches of Alice. These pictures also demonstrate erotic overtones. Three of the sketches form a triptych. All of the panels exhibit Alice drawn older than she was at the creation of these sketches as she was 11 at the time. She is sitting in a chair on a top floor while William is in a room below her. William is seen hunched over an instrument as he is serenading his sister in the first panel. He stands more erect in the next two panels. William is wearing a large head feather in each of the panels which progressively gets closer to the ceiling until it is pushing against it in the final panel. Growing from the outside of the building is a full bush in the first panel. The bush in the second panel is almost completely devoid of leaves and in the third panel, it is no longer there. The walls of the building shrink throughout the panels until they are almost nonexistent in the final panel. It has been argued that this triptych is a visual representation of a defloration fantasy. The fourth sketch created by William of his sister contains a drawing of her head when she was a young teen. Alice’s eyes are cast downward and underneath her head, William wrote the caption “The loveress of W.J.” The fifth sketch William drew of Alice when she was in her late teens. She is seen wearing a tight bodice and a feather hat. Across from her eye is a heart with an arrow through it, suggesting that she is in love. William’s initials are drawn on the sleeve covering Alice’s arm. This has been suggested to mean that William has branded his sister as his, and she was content with this as she wore her ‘heart’ on her sleeve.

Sources
Anna Robeson Brown Burr edited and wrote an introduction to Alice James, Her Brothers — Her Journal (1934). Jean Strouse published what has become the standard life (Alice James: A Biography) in 1980. Strouse steered something of a middle course between Alice-as-icon and Alice-as-victim. Ruth Yeazell published James's correspondence in The Death and Letters of Alice James (1981). Susan Sontag wrote a play about James, Alice in Bed (1993), which seems to waver between sympathy and impatience with its subject. Lynne Alexander wrote a sympathetic novel about Alice James, The Sister (2012).

References

External links 

Genius in the Family: Cameo Biography by Abby Wolf
Visiting the Emerson Girls by Frank Albrecht
"Illness as Metaphor" Susan Sontag's only play: Alice in Bed

1848 births
1892 deaths
American diarists
American people of Scotch-Irish descent
Deaths from breast cancer
Deaths from cancer in England
19th-century American writers
19th-century American women writers
American women non-fiction writers
Women diarists
19th-century diarists